Johan Cédric Micoud (born 24 July 1973) is a French former professional footballer who played mostly as an attacking midfielder.

He was considered a skilled midfielder and a dead-ball expert. During a 16-year career he played professionally, other than in his country, in Italy and Germany.

Micoud gained 17 caps for France, and represented the nation at the 2002 World Cup and Euro 2000, winning the latter tournament.

Club career
Born in Cannes, Micoud was a youth product of local AS Cannes' youth system, becoming the side's playmaker after Zinedine Zidane's departure to FC Girondins de Bordeaux. He helped the club to promotion from the second division in 1993 and qualification to the UEFA Cup in the following season.

In the 1998–99 campaign, two years after also signing for Bordeaux, Micoud played a pivotal role as the club were crowned Ligue 1 champions, and helped it to the following season UEFA Champions League's second group stage.

In the 2000 summer he moved abroad, initially joining Parma AC where he stayed for two seasons. Micoud then switched to Germany, signing for SV Werder Bremen where he enjoyed a successful four-year stay, the peak of which being a major force in the league and cup double in 2004 as he scored ten goals in the former competition, the highest for a midfielder alongside Bayer 04 Leverkusen's Bernd Schneider.

In June 2006, aged 32, Micoud returned to France, re-joining the club where he first flourished, Bordeaux, and enjoying immediate success by netting the winner in his first league match back at the club, at FC Lorient (1–0). He quickly became a key player in the squad, helping it to win the 2007 League Cup and fight for the title the following season. However, after two solid campaigns, Laurent Blanc announced on 10 May 2008 that the player's contract would not be renewed, and he retired from the game.

International career
Despite being selected in the French national team on several occasions throughout his career, Micoud never managed to secure a regular starting role, mainly due to the presence of Zidane who occupied the same position.

Courtesy of his stellar championship performances with Bordeaux, he made his debut on 17 August 1999 in a friendly match with Northern Ireland, and was subsequently picked for the squad which won UEFA Euro 2000, but he only played in one of the six matches of the tournament, in the group match against Netherlands, effectively a dead rubber given that both nations had already qualified both the group. He was also selected for the disastrous FIFA World Cup campaign of 2002, during which he was entrusted with the key midfield role against Uruguay, only to turn in a largely unconvincing display in a disappointing 0–0 draw.

Regardless of his consistently high level of performance at club level, Micoud found himself subsequently marginalised by the following national bosses: Jacques Santini only selected him once, in a friendly against Holland in 2004, and he failed to make the squad for Euro 2004 despite his Bremen performances. With Raymond Domenech, he did not win a single call-up for the 2006 World Cup qualifiers, with the finals to be held in familiar Germany.

Career statistics

Club

International

Honours
Bordeaux
Division 1: 1998–99
Coupe de la Ligue: 2006–07

Parma
Coppa Italia: 2001–02

Werder Bremen
Bundesliga: 2003–04
DFB-Pokal: 2003–04

France
UEFA European Championship: 2000

Individual
 kicker Bundesliga Team of the Season: 2002–03, 2003–04, 2005–06

References

External links

 
 
 
 

1973 births
Living people
Sportspeople from Cannes
French footballers
Association football midfielders
Ligue 1 players
Ligue 2 players
AS Cannes players
FC Girondins de Bordeaux players
Serie A players
Parma Calcio 1913 players
Bundesliga players
SV Werder Bremen players
France under-21 international footballers
France international footballers
UEFA Euro 2000 players
2002 FIFA World Cup players
UEFA European Championship-winning players
French expatriate footballers
Expatriate footballers in Italy
Expatriate footballers in Germany
Footballers from Provence-Alpes-Côte d'Azur